Disse Adeus (Said Goodbye) is a song by Banda Calypso. It did not become a single official, but it was very important for the arrival of the band Northeast Brazilian. It has a very intimate subject, such as a separation of a couple, the abandonment of a man, and the woman's desperation to explain what happened and ask around.

1999 singles
1990s ballads
Calypso songs
1999 songs